Penelope Fletcher (born 22 July 1988) is a British writer of paranormal romance and young-adult fantasy fiction. She was born in London and lives in the United Kingdom with her fiancé.  Her books have been published digitally as eBooks on Amazon Kindle, Barnes & Noble Nook, and Apple iBooks. She writes erotic fiction under pen name Hanna Lui.

In an interview with Wattpad, Fletcher mentions her writing process involves typing where she "just keeps going until it feels like it's the end."

Publications
Most of Penelope Fletcher's work is self-published.

Rae Wilder
The Rae Wilder novels are about a dystopian world in which humans are on the brink of extinction, threatened by magical demons such as vampires and fairies. They are aimed at the teen market. The titles of the books were changed after they were first published.
Glamour (Demon Girl) (October 2010)
Compel (Demon Day) (May 2011)
Enchant (Demon Dark) (October 2011)
Summon (DUE 2013)

Beautiful Damned
The Beautiful Damned novellas are a paranormal romance series aimed at the adult market.
Lunar Light (March 2011)
Moon Burn (Due Spring 2012)

Dark Creature
The Dark Creature books are a gothic romance series about vampires and lycanthropes.
Die, My Love (August 2011)
Bite, My Love (May 2012)

Dragon Souls
The Dragon Souls books are a fantasy romance series about a girl who helps a wounded dragon.
Smolder (December 2011)
Burn (Due December 2012)

Cosmic Lovely
The Cosmic Lovely books are a science-fiction romance series about a girl who is abducted by aliens and must find a way to save the Earth. They are aimed at young adults.
Chaos Theory (April 2012)
Flux Equinox (Due 2013)

Other books
Aurora Spectre Chronicle (November 2011)

References

English fantasy writers
English women novelists
Women science fiction and fantasy writers
British writers of young adult literature
21st-century English women writers
21st-century British novelists
Writers from London
1988 births
Living people
British women short story writers
Women writers of young adult literature
21st-century British short story writers
21st-century pseudonymous writers